Jazz is a 2001 television documentary miniseries directed by Ken Burns. It was broadcast on PBS in 2001 and was nominated for an Emmy Award for Outstanding Documentary or Nonfiction Series. Its chronological and thematic episodes provided a history of jazz, emphasizing innovative composers and musicians and American history.

Swing musicians Louis Armstrong and Duke Ellington are the central figures. Several episodes discussed the later contributions of Charlie Parker and Dizzy Gillespie to bebop, and of Miles Davis, Ornette Coleman, and John Coltrane to free and cool jazz. Of this 10-part documentary surveying jazz in the years from 1917 to 2001, all but the last episode are devoted to music pre-1961. The series was produced by Florentine Films in cooperation with the BBC and in association with WETA-TV, Washington.

Overview
The documentary concerned the history of jazz music in the United States, from its origins at the turn of the 20th century to the present day. It was narrated by Keith David and featured interviews with present-day musicians and critics such as trumpeter Wynton Marsalis (also the artistic director and co-producer of Jazz) and critics Gary Giddins and Stanley Crouch. Music critic and African-American  historian Gerald Early was a consultant. Broadcaster and producer Phil Schaap was interviewed briefly.

Visually, Jazz was in the same style as Ken Burns' previous works: slowly panning and zooming shots of photographs are mixed with period movie sequences, accompanied by music of, and commentary on, the period being examined. Between these sequences, present-day jazz figures provided anecdotes and explained the defining features of the major musicians' styles. Duke Ellington's "I Let a Song Go Out of My Heart" (1938) was a recurring motif at the opening and closing of individual episodes of the series.

The documentary focused on a number of major musicians: Louis Armstrong and Duke Ellington are the central figures, "providing the narrative thread around which the stories of other major figures turn", among them Sidney Bechet, Count Basie, Benny Goodman, Billie Holiday, Charlie Parker, Miles Davis and John Coltrane.

A number of companion CDs were released simultaneously.

Episodes
Each 87–123 minute episode of the ten episodes of Jazz covered a different era.

Reception

Positive reviews
Reason magazine wrote that Jazz "is filled with rewards, many of them proffered unintentionally. ... Burns's documentary gifts are not visionary, analytical, nor even properly historical. Rather, he is a talented biographer, and his films are most effective when he is able to present an overarching narrative in terms of the biographical detail of that narrative's participants."

Jason Van Bergen said, "The nearly 19 hours of documentary coverage contained in the Jazz series unravels like a fine wine", and due to the series' attention to detail, "a complete discussion of every episode in Ken Burns's Jazz would be better suited for a master's thesis" than to his brief review. ... Burns's encyclopedic rendering of the growth of jazz cannot be questioned. Followers of the music will need this set on their shelves; but perhaps slightly more surprisingly, serious students of American history may also require the set to supplement their versions of the past century."

In The New York Times, Ben Ratlife wrote that the program's "major thematic device is effective, and would not come naturally to a music-focused jazz historian. It is to show what happens when American whites and blacks encounter each other, not in the abstract but person to person, and make some sort of connection."

Writing in the National Review, Deroy Murdock wrote, "the TV documentary sometimes feels like Thanksgiving dinner. It's rich, delightful, filling, altogether satisfying, and, here and there, hypnotic. ... Burns's film is never dull. It's fascinating and captivating."

Negative reviews
Gene Santoro, writing in The Nation, notes, "If Burns had cut the final episode and billed this as Jazz: The First 50 Years, more of the discussion might be where it belongs—on the movie."

William Berlind wrote in The Observer, "In allowing Mr. Marsalis to guide him, Mr. Burns has ultimately done us a disservice. He has managed to make a vital, evolving music seem dead and static."

The British newspaper The Guardian wrote, "The series' principal totemic figures, quite rightly, are Louis Armstrong, Duke Ellington, Billie Holiday, Charlie Parker and Miles Davis. Since a large proportion of Jazz is devoted to the swing era, two white bandleaders, Benny Goodman and Artie Shaw, are also given prominence—as, later on, is Dave Brubeck. But even some critics who have spent their lives arguing for a proper recognition of jazz's African-American essence believe that Burns—with the encouragement of Marsalis, Crouch and Murray—has pushed the Afrocentric line so far that the refusal to give credit to the contribution of white musicians undermines the series' historical accuracy."

Professor emeritus Frank Tirro wrote, "He gives, as one example, Louis Armstrong's 'West End Blues' as 'a reflection of the country in the moments before the Great Depression.' I cannot see how he can support this statement. What is it reflecting? The African Americans in Harlem, the Wall Street entrepreneurs, or the white middle-class farmers in Kansas and Iowa? This is bull-session history."

Compilation albums
On November 7, 2000, 22 companion single-artist compilation albums, all titled Ken Burns Jazz, were released by the Verve and Columbia/Legacy labels. A five CD box set, Ken Burns Jazz: The Story of America's Music, was also released, along with a single album sampler of that box set (The Best of Ken Burns Jazz).

The following albums were released by Verve:
 Count Basie – Allmusic [ link]
 Art Blakey – Allmusic [ link]
 John Coltrane – Allmusic link
 Ella Fitzgerald – Allmusic [ link]
 Dizzy Gillespie – Allmusic [ link]
 Coleman Hawkins – Allmusic [ link]
 Billie Holiday – Allmusic [ link]
 Charlie Parker – Allmusic [ link]
 Sonny Rollins – Allmusic [ link]
 Sarah Vaughan – Allmusic [ link]
 Lester Young – Allmusic [ link]

The following albums were released by Columbia/Legacy:
 Louis Armstrong – Allmusic [ link]
 Sidney Bechet – Allmusic [ link]
 Dave Brubeck – Allmusic [ link]
 Ornette Coleman – Allmusic [ link]
 Miles Davis – Allmusic [ link]
 Duke Ellington – Allmusic [ link]
 Benny Goodman – Allmusic [ link]
 Herbie Hancock – Allmusic [ link]
 Fletcher Henderson – Allmusic [ link]
 Charles Mingus – Allmusic [ link]
 Thelonious Monk – Allmusic [ link]
 Various Artists – The Best of Ken Burns Jazz – Allmusic [ link]
 Various Artists – Ken Burns Jazz: The Story of America's Music – Allmusic [ link]

In 2002, Columbia also released two low-priced box sets, each containing three of the previously released single-artist collections.
 Ken Burns Jazz, Vol. 1 (Includes Louis Armstrong, Duke Ellington, and Benny Goodman compilations) – Allmusic [ link]
 Ken Burns Jazz, Vol. 2 (Includes Thelonious Monk, Miles Davis, and Dave Brubeck compilations) – Allmusic [ link]

References

External links
 Ken Burns' Jazz on PBS
 Ken Burns on PBS
 Ken Burns' Jazz review by cosmopolis.ch
 
 Jazz Greats in One Immortal 1958 Image (New York Times, September 25, 2018)

Documentary television series about music
PBS original programming
2000s American television miniseries
History of jazz
2001 American television series debuts
2001 American television series endings
English-language television shows
2000s in jazz
2000s American documentary television series
Works about jazz